Matthäus Schiner (or Schinner, c. 1465 – 1 October 1522) was a bishop of Sion, Cardinal and diplomat. He was a military commander in several battles in northern Italy.

Biography
He was born in Mühlebach (in what is now the Swiss canton of Valais), the son of the farmer and carpenter Peter Schiner and Anna Welschen; his uncle Nicholas Schiner, later Bishop of Sion (Sitten), gave him his early instruction. He embraced the ecclesiastical career, and eventually became parish priest of Aernen (1496), and canon and dean of the cathedral of Sion. When his uncle resigned, he was made Bishop of Sion (20 September 1499). Schinner's diplomatic skill and his influence on the allied Swiss Confederacy made him the right hand of Pope Julius II and Pope Leo X in their efforts to unite Italy and expel the French. 
In 1511, as a result of an alliance brought about by Schiner, the Swiss made two unsuccessful campaigns against Milan. As a reward for securing this alliance, he was made Bishop of Novara and also cardinal in 1511. In 1512, as papal legate for Italy and Germany, he was; appointed commander of a Swiss and Venetian army, drove the French from Milan and established Maximilian Sforza as duke. However, as Louis XII again captured Milan after the death of Julius II, Schiner once more took the field at the head of the Swiss Confederates, and defeated the French in the battle of Novara (1513). The Duke of Milan rewarded Schiner with the margraviate of Vigevano.

When under Francis I of France the French recrossed the Alps, Schiner led the Swiss troops, part of which had retired, at the unfortunate battle of Marignano (1515). In 1516 he raised another army with the aid of England, but was unable to regain Milan. He now sought to attain his end by an alliance between the pope, the emperor, England, and Spain, for which purpose he went himself in 1516 to London, but the reconciliation of the Swiss Confederacy and the emperor with France made the alliance abortive.

During his long absence from home the French party there, under his bitter enemy George Supersax, raised a rebellion and drove him from Sion. He lived for several years at Zurich (1517–19), and thenceforth mostly at the court of the emperor. He supported the election of Emperor Charles V in 1519, for which he was made bishop of Catania in Sicily (November 1520). In 1521 he led an army of Swiss Confederates in the imperial campaign against Francis I for the possession of Milan. But for his passionate hatred of France, he would have been elected the successor of Leo X; however, Pope Adrian VI called him to Rome as administrator of the States of the Church. He died there of the plague without having seen his diocese again.

His varied and large scattered correspondence is the only literary work he left. The date of his birth has been disputed, as the statements concerning it differ nearly twenty years. The year is unknown, and all direct indications are lacking. We know, however, that he attended the School of Lupulus at Bern, which was not opened until 1493. As Schiner was a priest in 1492, the year of his birth could not be later than 1470.

References

Joller, 'Kardinal Schinner als kathol. Kirchenfürst' and 'Kardinal Schinners Beziehungen zur Wahl Kaiser Karls V, 1519' in Blätter zur Walliser Geschichte I (1895)
Lauber, 'Kardinal Schinners Bann u. Interdikt über seine Gegner'  in Blätter zur Walliser Geschichte IV (1909)
Blosch, 'Der Kardinal Schinner' in Sonntagsblatt des Bundes (1890), nos. 14, 15
Wirt, 'Akten uber die diplomatischen Beziehungen der römischen Curie in der Schweiz 1512–1552' in Quellen zur Schweizer geschichte XVI (1895), xiii-xix.

External links
Salvador Miranda, The Cardinals of the Holy Roman Church, Biographical Dictionary

1460s births
1522 deaths
15th-century Swiss people
16th-century Swiss people
Prince-bishops in the Holy Roman Empire
Bishops of Novara
Swiss cardinals
16th-century cardinals 
16th-century Roman Catholic bishops in the Holy Roman Empire
16th-century deaths from plague (disease)
History of Valais